BSC Panthers Fürstenfeld is an Austrian professional basketball club based in Fürstenfeld. The club was founded in 1955 and won the Austrian national championship one time: in the 2008–09 season.

Fürstenfeld participated in European competitions once, when it played in the FIBA Korać Cup in the 1995–96 season.

Honours
Austrian Championship (1): 
2008
Runner-up: 2002, 2010

Austrian Cup (1): 
2009

Austrian Supercup (1):
2009

Season by season

Notable players

 Michael Fraser
 Marko Car
 Miljan Goljović 
 Giorgi Gamqrelidze
 Jonathan Levy  
 Anthony Shavies 
 Desmond Penigar

External links
Eurobasket.com BSC Fürstenfeld Panthers Page

Basketball teams in Austria
Fürstenfeld
Basketball teams established in 1955
1955 establishments in Austria